The 1923 Wightman Cup, named after the founder Hazel Hotchkiss Wightman, was the first edition of the Wightman Cup, the annual women's team tennis competition between the United States and Great Britain. It was held at the West Side Tennis Club in Forest Hills, Queens in New York City in New York in the United States.

The competition was scheduled to start on Friday, 10 August but was postponed until Saturday in observance of a day of mourning for U.S. President Warren G. Harding. As there was no play on Sunday the event was concluded on Monday, 13 August. The inaugural competition was played as the opening match of the newly constructed tennis stadium at the West Side Tennis Club. The United States team won the inaugural cup by winning all seven matches.

Result

See also
 1923 Davis Cup

References

1923
1923 in tennis
1923 in women's tennis
1923 in American tennis
1923 in British sport
1923 in English tennis